Plaque may refer to:

Commemorations or awards
 Commemorative plaque, a plate or tablet fixed to a wall to mark an event, person, etc.
 Memorial Plaque (medallion), issued to next-of-kin of dead British military personnel after World War I
 Plaquette, a small plaque in bronze or other materials

Science and healthcare
 Amyloid plaque
 Atheroma or atheromatous plaque, a buildup of deposits within the wall of an artery
 Dental plaque, a biofilm that builds up on teeth
 A broad papule, a type of cutaneous condition
 Pleural plaque, associated with mesothelioma, cancer often caused by exposure to asbestos
 Senile plaques, an extracellular protein deposit in the brain implicated in Alzheimer's disease
 Skin plaque, a plateau-like lesion that is greater in its diameter than in its depth
 Viral plaque, a visible structure formed by virus propagation within a cell culture

Other uses
 Plaque, a rectangular casino token

See also
 
 
 Builder's plate
 Plac (disambiguation)
 Placard
 Plack (disambiguation)
 Plague (disambiguation)